Esther Elizabeth Blackie (29 January 1916 – 9 March 1991) was a New Zealand cricketer who played as a wicket-keeper and right-handed batter. She played in one Test match for New Zealand in 1949. She played domestic cricket for Otago.

References

External links
 
 

1916 births
1991 deaths
Cricketers from Invercargill
New Zealand women cricketers
New Zealand women Test cricketers
Otago Sparks cricketers